Thorncliffe (also marked on some maps as Thorncliff) is a hamlet in the civil parish of Kirkburton, in the Kirklees district, in the county of West Yorkshire, England.

History 
The name "Thorncliff" means 'Thorny clearing', Thorncliff was also known as "Thornotelegh", "Thornetele", "Thornitelay", Thorniceley", "Thornykeley", "Thorntelay", "Thornecley", "Thornclay", "Thorncliffe" and "Thorneclifte".

Thorncliffe was historically a farming settlement, today it consists of a farm, a plant hire depot, a few houses and the Thorncliffe Working Mens Club.

Nearby settlements 
Nearby settlements include the large town of Huddersfield, the hamlet's post town (five miles to the northwest) and the village of Kirkburton.

Other features 
To the east is Thorncliffe Spring wood.

Location grid

References

Sources
 AA Huddersfield Street by Street
 A-Z West Yorkshire

Hamlets in West Yorkshire
Kirkburton